Agaric acid, also known as agaricin or 2-hydroxynonadecane-1,2,3-tricarboxylic acid, is an organic tricarboxylic acid (fatty acid) found in fungi, e.g. Laricifomes officinalis. Its molecular formula is C22H40O7.

Chemical properties 
 
Agaric acid, as any other fatty acid, has an amphipathic character. It means that it has both polar (hydroxyl groups) and nonpolar (hydrocarbon chain) sections, and therefore, it is not completely water-soluble. It is a tribasic acid, and therefore, it can donate up to 3 hydrogen ions to other bases in an acid-base reaction. Other examples of tribasic acids are phosphoric acid or citric acid.
It is an odorless and tasteless acid, and we can also distinguish it by its white color. Its melting point at atmospheric pressure is 140 °C.

Molecular structure 
Agaric acid is a type of fatty acid that is composed by a long hydrocarbon chain ("tail") and three carboxylic acid groups at one end ("head"). The hydrocarbon chain has sixteen carbons and thirty four hydrogens.

This acid has microcrystalline properties, and therefore, forms small crystals that can not be seen through the naked eye, but are only visible with an optical microscope.

Functions 

Agaric acid is used as an inhibitor of metabolism in several animal experiments. It is shown that this acid prevents the formation of C2 units from citrate and reduces the availability of citrate for the activation of acetyl-CoA carboxylase.
Moreover, it has an important role in the metabolism of lipids, because it influences sterol synthesis.

Agaric acid induces the mitochondrial permeability transition by collaborating with adenine nucleotide translocase. It facilitates the efflux of accumulated Ca2+, disrupts the potential of the membrane and causes mitochondrial lumps. All of these effects bet on membrane fluidity. It's thought that agaric acid activates the opening of membrane pores due to the union of citrate to ADP transporters.

However, a later research showed that N-ethylmaleimide inhibits carboxyatractyloside and agaric acid effects. It was found that this amine restricts the pore opening action of agaric acid, but it does not affect the constraint of ADP exchange by agaric acid.

Medical use 

Agaric acid is used in medicine as an anhidrotic agent in order to stop excessive perspiration as it paralyses the nerve terminations in the human body's sweat glands. For example, it helps to avoid tuberculosis patients' frequent night sweats. In addition, when taken in doses from 5 to 15 grams, agaric acid produces vomiting in humans. In the past, agaric acid was used as an irritant, an antidiarrhoeal and a bronchial secretions reducer.

Other uses 
 
Physicians use agaric acid, but it also can be used in many other subjects such as veterinary and biochemistry.
In lower animals, this substance depresses the nervous, respiratory and circulatory systems. It has been used as a metabolic inhibitor at the cellular and subcellular level in scientific animal experiments. Agaric acid has also been used as an alpha-glycerophosphate dehydrogenase inhibitor in Crithidia fasciculata, which is a species of parasitic protist.

References

Fatty acids
Tricarboxylic acids